César Augusto Rodríguez Diburga (born 26 June 1997) is a Peruvian racewalking athlete. He represented Peru at the 2020 Summer Olympics in the men's 20 kilometres walk.

Career
In February 2014, Rodríguez represented Peru at the 2014 South American Race Walking Championships in the youth 10 kilometres walk and won a silver medal. In August 2014, he represented Peru at the 2014 Summer Youth Olympics and was the flag bearer at the opening ceremony. He competed in the 10 kilometre walk and finished in fourth place with a time of 42:26.49. He then won a gold medal at the 2015 Pan American Junior Athletics Championships in the 10 kilometres walk.

Rodríguez represented Peru at the 2018 South American Games in the 20 kilometers walk and finished with a time of 1:26:23 to win a silver medal.

He represented Peru at the 2020 Summer Olympics in the men's 20 kilometres walk and finished in 21st place.

References

1997 births
Living people
Peruvian male racewalkers
Athletes (track and field) at the 2014 Summer Youth Olympics
Athletes (track and field) at the 2020 Summer Olympics
Olympic athletes of Peru
People from Huancayo
21st-century Peruvian people